Nilópolis Futebol Clube, commonly known as Nilópolis, is a Brazilian football club based in Nilópolis, Rio de Janeiro state.

History
The club was founded on November 11, 1977. Nilópois closed its football department in 1996, reopening it in 2004.

Stadium
Nilópolis Futebol Clube play their home games at Estádio José Alvarenga. The stadium has a maximum capacity of 2,500 people.

References

Association football clubs established in 1977
Football clubs in Rio de Janeiro (state)
1977 establishments in Brazil